Shivam Chauhan (born 14 October 1997) is an Indian cricketer. He made his first-class debut for Haryana in the 2016–17 Ranji Trophy on 13 November 2016. He made his Twenty20 debut for Haryana in the 2016–17 Inter State Twenty-20 Tournament on 29 January 2017. He made his List A debut for Haryana in the 2016–17 Vijay Hazare Trophy on 25 February 2017.

References

External links
 

1997 births
Living people
Indian cricketers
Haryana cricketers
People from Saharanpur